The Drewes' moss frog (Arthroleptella drewesii) is a species of frog in the family Pyxicephalidae.
It is endemic to Fernkloof Nature Reserve & nearby surroundings in South Africa.
Its natural habitats are Mediterranean-type shrubby vegetation and rivers.
It is threatened by habitat loss.

References

Arthroleptella
Endemic amphibians of South Africa
Amphibians described in 1994
Taxonomy articles created by Polbot